Ruslan Abishov (Azerbaijani: Ruslan Ibrahim oğlu Abışov; born 10 October 1987) is an Azerbaijani professional footballer who plays as a defender for Azerbaijan Premier League club Zira.

Career

Club
Abishov can be considered as product of the Neftchi Baku youth system. He has spent most of his career in Neftchi. He became the winner of Azerbaijan Premier League in 2010–11, 2011–12 seasons in Neftchi, then he was transferred to Khazar Lankaran. On 26 February 2013 he signed a contract with Rubin Kazan for 2.5 years.

On 24 June 2014, Abishov joined Azerbaijan Premier League side Gabala FK on a six-month loan deal, before signing a six-month contract with the club in following the completion of the loan deal.

On 14 September 2015, Abishov re-signed for Gabala follow complications to his registration at Khazar Lankaran. Following the conclusion of the 2015–16 season, Abishov left Gabala having turned down a new contract with the club.

On 29 June 2016, Abishov signed a one-year contract with Inter Baku. On 12 January 2017, Abıshov signed a six-month contract with Neftchi Baku. Abishov extended his contract in summer of 2017 and captained the team during the 2017–18 season when Neftchi claimed bronze medals in the season, highest league result since 2013. 
On 10 June 2019, Neftchi released Abishov from his contract by mutual consent.

On 13 June 2019, Abishov signed a two-year contract with Sabah FC.

On 26 June 2021, Zira FK, announced the signing of Abishov.

International
Abıshov made his debut for Azerbaijan on 5 September 2009 against Finland in 2010 WC qualification. He scored his first goal on 18 November 2009 against Czech in a friendly match.

Career statistics

Club

International

Statistics accurate as of match played 9 June 2018

International goals

|-
| 1. || 18 November 2009 || Tahnoun bin Mohammed, Al Ain, United Arab Emirates ||  || 2–0 || 2–0 || Friendly||
|-
| 2. || 29 March 2011 || King Baudouin Stadium, Brussels, Belgium ||  || 1–1 || 4–1 || UEFA Euro 2012 qualifying||
|-
| 3. || 7 September 2012 || Tofiq Bahramov Stadium, Baku, Azerbaijan ||  || 1–1 || 1–1 || 2014 World Cup qualification||
|-
| 4. || 7 June 2013 || Bakcell Arena, Baku, Azerbaijan ||  || 1–0 || 1–1 || 2014 World Cup qualification||
|-
| colspan="8"|Correct as of 7 October 2015	
|-
|}

Honours

Club
 Neftchi Baku
Azerbaijan Premier League: (2) 2010–11, 2011–12

International
Azerbaijan U23
 Islamic Solidarity Games: (1) 2017

Individual
The best midfielder of Azerbaijan (1): 2010
The best defender of Azerbaijan  (1): 2011
Azerbaijani Footballer of the Year (1): 2012

References

External links 
 

1987 births
Living people
Footballers from Baku
Azerbaijani footballers
Azerbaijani expatriate footballers
Azerbaijan international footballers
Azerbaijan Premier League players
Khazar Lankaran FK players
FC Rubin Kazan players
Gabala FC players
Shamakhi FK players
Sabah FC (Azerbaijan) players
Azerbaijani expatriate sportspeople in Russia
Expatriate footballers in Russia
Russian Premier League players
Association football defenders
Neftçi PFK players